Zonuz (also Romanized as Zunus) is a city in the Central District of Marand County, East Azerbaijan province, Iran. At the 2006 census, its population was 2,618 in 826 households. The following census in 2011 counted 2,626 people in 802 households. The latest census in 2016 showed a population of 2,465 people in 843 households.

External links
more references
Azapadegan Research Institute for Iranian cultures and civilization (includes research articles on Adhari)
 http://www.fallingrain.com/world/IR/1/Zonuz.html
 http://www.iranchamber.com/index.php
 http://www.tageo.com/index-e-ir-v-01-d-m4357019.htm
 http://www.iran-daily.com/1387/3272/html/iranica.htm
erani.tk Lists of many similarities between some Iranian languages, in English and Turkish
Society for Iranian Linguistics
 Iranian EFL Journal
Persian Language (Persian)

References 

Marand County

Cities in East Azerbaijan Province

Populated places in East Azerbaijan Province

Populated places in Marand County

Tourist attractions in Iran

Tourist attractions in East Azerbaijan Province